Michiel van Breda (12 August 1775– 12 August 1847) was a South African farmer, founder of Bredasdorp, Mayor of Cape Town and a Freemason.

Roots

Van Breda was born on 12 August 1775 in Cape Town. His parents were Pieter van Breda and  Catharina Sophia Myburg. He married three times.  Out of his marriages with  Gesina van  Reenen, Beatrix Elizabeth Lategan and Maria Adriana Smalberger he became the father of nine children. He died in Cape Town on 12 August 1847.

Merino sheep farming
In 1817 van Breda was farming on  Zoetendals Vallei farm in the region which is today called Overberg. He imported the Rambouillet Merino  from France. Together with the Merino's from Saxony in Germany, which he also imported, he created the South African Merino. He was the first person to start breeding with Merinos in South Africa. His partner was F. W. Reitz. A Merino is a sheep primarily breed for its wool. It is originally from Spain. The first Merinos date back to the 12th century. The sheep is particularly well adapted to low rainfall environments  climates.

Bredasdorp
Van Breda and P.V. van der Byl wanted to build a church for the farming community in the Overberg, part of the Cape Province. They could not agree on a location, so both build a church, 15 kilometres apart. Two towns were founded this way. Today one is called Bredasdorp and the other Napier. Van Breda's church was built on the farm Langefontein in 1838. When a town started to develop around the church it was called Bredasdorp, a name derived from Michiel van Breda's last name.

Mayor of Cape Town
In 1840 Cape Town, which was founded as a refreshment station by Jan van Riebeeck in 1652, was declared a municipality. Van Breda was the first mayor and was in office from 1840–1844. He stayed on Oranjezicht farm.

Freemason
He was a member of the Dutch section of the South African Freemasons. He was Grand Master of the Lodge de Goede hoop from 1831-1837.

References 

Mayors of Cape Town
1775 births
1847 deaths
South African farmers
South African Freemasons